Dialectica anselmella is a moth of the family Gracillariidae. It is found on La Réunion.

The larvae feed on Cordia amplifolia.

References

Moths described in 2011
Dialectica (moth)
Moths of Réunion
Endemic fauna of Réunion